Rhodocactus stenanthus is a species of cactus that is endemic to Brazil. First described as Pereskia stenantha, it was transferred to Rhodocactus in 2016. Like all species in the genus Rhodocactus, and unlike most cacti, it has persistent leaves. In its native locality, it is sometimes used in hedges.

Description
Mature stems develop grayish-brown bark. Like all species of Rhodocactus, and unlike most other cacti, R. stenanthus has persistent leaves, that are variable in shape and size. The areoles bear leaves (brachyblast leaves) along with spines. The flowers are orange-red on the outside and pink inside and are borne in terminal or axillary inflorescences of 1–15 forming dense clusters. In its native habitat, R. stenanthus flowers in the spring and summer, from November to April.

In all features other than the flowers, R. stenanthus closely resembles R. bahiensis. The shape, colour and orientation of the flowers suggests they may be pollinated by hummingbirds.

Taxonomy
The species was first described by Friedrich Ritter in 1979 as Pereskia stenantha. Molecular phylogenetic studies from 2005 onwards suggested that when Pereskia was broadly circumscribed, it was not monophyletic, and consisted of three clades. In 2016, the genus Rhodocactus was revived for one of these clades, with P. stenantha included as R. stenanthus.

Distribution and habitat
Rhodocactus stenanthus is native to northeast and southeast Brazil.

Conservation
Rhodocactus bahiensis has been assessed as Least Concern, with no major threats. is a common species with a stable population trend and regenerates well after disturbance.

Uses
In the areas where it grows, local people may plant Rhodocactus stenanthus in hedges.

References

Pereskioideae
Endemic flora of Brazil
Flora of Northeast Brazil
Flora of Southeast Brazil
Cacti of South America
Least concern plants
Taxonomy articles created by Polbot
Taxobox binomials not recognized by IUCN